Anderson Parra (born 18 October 1989) is a Colombian professional racing cyclist. He rode at the 2015 UCI Track Cycling World Championships.

References

1989 births
Living people
Colombian male cyclists
Place of birth missing (living people)
Cyclists at the 2015 Pan American Games
Pan American Games competitors for Colombia
Competitors at the 2014 Central American and Caribbean Games
Competitors at the 2018 Central American and Caribbean Games